Kings of Chaos is the third studio album by British symphonic black metal band Hecate Enthroned. It was released in 1999 via Blackend Records, and it was the band's first album to feature Dean Seddon as vocalist (who replaced the former one, Jon Kennedy, who was fired in the same year) and keyboardist Darren "Daz" Bishop (who replaced Michael Snell).

With this album, Hecate Enthroned greatly toned down their previous symphonic black metal sonority and aesthetics, dropped the corpse paint used on the previous few albums and adopted a style more reminiscent of melodic blackened death metal, albeit still retaining the keyboards and dark black metal melodies of the older albums.

The track "I Am Born" is the first part of the "I Am Born" trilogy; the second part can be heard on 2001's Miasma, and the third one on 2004's Redimus.

Track listing

Personnel
 Hecate Enthroned
 Dean Seddon — vocals
 Andy Milnes — guitar
 Nigel Dennen — guitar
 Rob Kendrick — drums, percussion
 Dylan Hughes — bass guitar
 Darren Bishop — keyboards

Additional personnel
 Pete "Pee-Wee" Coleman — production
 Andrea Wright — engineering

References

External links 
 Kings of Chaos at Encyclopaedia Metallum

Hecate Enthroned albums
1999 albums